Blaarkop or Groningen is a breed of dairy cattle. Blaarkop is Dutch for blister head. Its main breeding area is in Groningen (province), Netherlands. 

The breed has been mentioned as early as the 14th century. From the 19th century, there are also Blaarkoppen in the Utrecht and Leiden regions. The Blaarkop breed is sturdily built with matching muscles, a horned head, and strong legs. Both red (60% of the population) and black (40%) Blaarkoppen exist. The body is solid red or black, while the head is white with a red or black ring (blister) around the eyes; the tail has a white tip.

Blaarkop cattle feature prominently in the work of novelist and poet Marieke Lucas Rijneveld.

References

Cattle breeds originating in the Netherlands